Afrocarpus mannii is an evergreen coniferous tree native to the Afromontane forests of São Tomé Island in the Gulf of Guinea, growing at altitudes of 1,300 m up to the summit at 2,024 m. It was formerly classified as Podocarpus mannii.

It is a small tree, growing 10–15 m tall. The leaves are spirally arranged, lanceolate, 6–8 cm long on mature trees, larger, to 15 cm long and 2 cm broad, on vigorous young trees. The seed cones are highly modified, with a single 2 cm diameter seed with a thin fleshy coating borne on a short peduncle. The pollen cones are 1.5-2.5 cm long, solitary or in pairs on a short stem.

References

Gymnosperm Database: Afrocarpus mannii
Dallimore, W., & Jackson, A. B. (1966). A Handbook of Coniferae and Ginkgoaceae, 4th ed., revised. Edward Arnold.

Podocarpaceae
Endemic flora of São Tomé and Príncipe
Vulnerable flora of Africa
Flora of São Tomé Island